Jarosław Kuźniar (born 29 January 1978) is a Polish television and radio presenter. Connected with TVN and TVN24 from 2010 to 2016 c. He has been the host of TV show X Factor in 2011 and 2012.

Biography
He graduated from High School no. 1 in Dzierżoniów. Then, he studied at the University of Wrocław, where he received a B.A. in Philology, field of study journalism.

At the beginning of his career he was connected with Sudety Radio (Sudeten Mts. Radio) and Sudecka Television (Sudeten TV). He also worked in Polskie Radio Wrocław. In 1999 he moved to Warsaw, where in Polskie Radio Program III he hosted Zapraszamy do Trójki. Then he worked  in Radio Zet for 5 years, where he  prepared afternoon news and Wydarzenia Dnia. For more than a year he was a columnist in ?dlaczego magazine.

Since 6 January 2007 he has been working in TVN24, where he is the host of the morning show You Get Up and You Know. From 26 July 2010 to 10 September 2010 he hosted Very Political Talk, which filled in the timeslot of Rymanowski's Talk during the holiday. Since September 2010, the programme has been on air only on Fridays. From Monday to Thursday he still hosts You Get Up and You Know. In 30 May 2016 he left TVN Group.

X Factor
In late 2010 he was offered by TVN a presenting role on a TV show X Factor. On 17 January 2011 he confirmed on Dzień Dobry TVN On Polish Language on Auto on Black eye on Eua that he would host the programme. On 21 November 2011 it was announced that he would not be back to present the series due to personal reasons and his commitments to TVN24.

Awards
In 2009 he received Wiktor in category Discovery of the Year and MediaTor in category InstigaTOR. He was also nominated for Telekamery in category News.

References

1978 births
Living people
Polish journalists
Polish radio journalists
Polish television journalists